Aoshang is a rural town in Jingzhou Miao and Dong Autonomous County, Hunan, China. The town is mainly inhabited by Han, Dong and Miao people. Dong and Miao accounted for 41.7% and 33.3% respectively. It is surrounded by Diling Township on the north, Taiyangping Township on the northeast, Sanqiao Township on the southwest, Dabaozi Town on the northwest, and Quyang Town on the south.

History
After the establishment of the Communist State in 1950, Aoshang was known as "West District". In 1953 Aoshang Township was established. In 1958 it was renamed "Aoshang People's Commune". It was upgraded to a town in December 1995.

Administrative division
As of December 2017, the town is divided into 11 villages: Xiangshui, Yangmei, Xianfeng, Xiaokai, Dakai, Aoshang, Xinhua, Donglin, Jiulong, Qiaotou, Geying, and 1 community: Aoshang.

Geography
The Diling River passes through the town south to north.

Economy
The town's economy is based on nearby mineral resources and agricultural resources. Mineral resources include gold, zinc, aluminium and antimony.

Transportation
The National Highway G209 passes across the town south to north.

References

Towns of Huaihua
Jingzhou Miao and Dong Autonomous County